Bobby Roe (born December 15, 1978) is an American actor, director, and screenwriter, primarily known for his film The Houses October Built and its sequel The Houses October Built 2. It was produced by Steven Schneider, whose hits include Paranormal Activity, Insidious, The Devil Inside and M. Night Shyamalan's The Visit, Split, Glass and Old.

Career
He grew up in Dallas, Texas and graduated from Plano Senior High School. Attended UCLA and was an All-American pitcher on their baseball team where he played alongside MLB All Star's Chase Utley, Eric Byrnes and Garrett Atkins. He was then cast as a stunt double for Roger Clemens in Zack Snyder's "Rocket Unit" Cingular commercial. Roe eventually received his masters in film at Loyola Marymount University and went on to be a writer/producer that helped launch Reelz Channel. He was originally cast as Mark Mulder in Moneyball when Steven Soderbergh was directing.

Roe directed, wrote and starred in the film The Houses October Built in 2014, and its sequel The Houses October Built 2. His brother Mikey Roe, Zack Andrews, Jeff Larson, and Brandy Schaefer appear as themselves. Both he and Zack Andrews have also written the children's book Narah and the Unicorn - The Original Narwhal Story.

According to Entertainment Weekly and Variety, Roe will direct and write a segment of the horror anthology, Isolation.

Roe has been tapped to write and direct the shared horror universe film "A Wicked Tale" from the producers of The Walking Dead.Forbes and UploadVR released that Roe and Andrews, with the help of their company Haunt Society, helped create the first sanctioned virtual reality haunted house for   Rec_Room_(video_game).

Filmography

Awards
Best Feature Length Film from the Midnight X-Treme Category from the Sitges Film Festival (2014, won)
Best Screenplay Bobby Roe, Zack Andrews, Jason Zada from the Macabre Faire Film Festival (2015, won)

Bibliography
 Narah and the Unicorn: The Original Narwhal Story'' (2017) Narah and the Unicorn - The Original Narwhal Story

References

External links

Living people
1978 births
21st-century American male actors
University of California, Los Angeles alumni
Loyola Marymount University alumni